Zhou Xing (1905–1975) birth name Liu Jiubang, also known as Liu Weixin was a People's Republic of China politician born in Yongfeng County, Jiangxi Province. He was twice governor of Yunnan and Chinese Communist Party Committee Secretary of Yunnan.

1905 births
1975 deaths
People's Republic of China politicians from Jiangxi
Chinese Communist Party politicians from Jiangxi
Governors of Yunnan
Delegates to the 2nd National People's Congress
Delegates to the 3rd National People's Congress
Delegates to the 4th National People's Congress
Chinese police officers
Politicians from Ji'an